Husøy is a village in Senja Municipality in Troms og Finnmark county, Norway. The village covers the entire island of Husøy which is located in the Øyfjorden off the northwest coast of the large island of Senja.

Up until recent times, the island was only accessible by boat; however, it is now connected to the island of Senja by a  causeway. The island has a grocery store, primary and secondary school, daycare, restaurant, and Husøy Chapel.

References

External links
 
 Bygdefolket reddet hjørnesteinsbedriften da den fikk koronatrøbbel [The people of the village, rescued (the company that employs a significant number of the locals, or) hjørnesteinsbedriften] (16 March 2021) NRK. Journalist: Tonje Hareland

Islands of Troms og Finnmark
Populated places of Arctic Norway
Senja
Villages in Troms og Finnmark